The Alco 539T was a diesel prime mover (locomotive engine) built by the American Locomotive Company. This engine was also used as a stationary powerplant, used in pipeline pumping stations, tugboats and dredges. The 539 engine was built at Alco's Auburn, New York engine plant and later starting in September 1949 in Canada. The 539T was equipped with the Buchi turbocharger, being made under license by the Elliott Manufacturing Company of Jeannette, Pennsylvania. The first 539T engines were used in S-2 switchers and DL-105 passenger locomotives built in September 1940. Alco locomotives using this engine include the S-2, S-4, RS-1, RSC-1, RSD-1, DL-105, DL-107, DL-108, DL-109, and DL-110. MLW locomotives using this engine include the S-2, S-4, S-7, S-12, RS-1, and RSC-13.

An eight-cylinder inline version of the 539T was developed by Alco. It was never used in a locomotive, but a twin bank V8 had been planned to be used in an early version of the “Black Maria” DL-202/DL-203 in response to EMD's FT locomotive. The inline 8-539T was used in stationary and marine applications.

The 539 engine was developed in response to the perceived drawback that Alco's line of diesel switchers had a restricted field of vision because of the high hood. Both Baldwin and EMC were offering diesel switchers with a lower engine hood that the trainmen could see over. The 539 engine was developed from the 538 engine, both had the same cylinder dimensions. The engine base of the 538 was flat and rode on a flat underframe. The change that the 539 offered was to lower the base of the engine into the frame. This was done with revised mounting lugs and a modified oil pan.

A very similar engine developed for the United States Navy was the 540T. This engine used a welded block. The welded construction was required because the specified shock tolerance requirements prohibit the use of cast blocks. The Navy 540 was used in patrol boats, mine sweepers, mine layers, and tug boats:

 30 of 123 s
 Two 855shp ALCO 539 diesel engines, Farrel-Birmingham single reduction gear, two shafts.
 9 of 95 s
 Two 1,559shp ALCO 539, Westinghouse single reduction gear

References

 
Close examination of actual engine blocks.
Steinbrenner, Richard T. (2003). The American Locomotive Company: A Centennial Remembrance. On Track Publishers LLC, New Brunswick, NJ. .

Diesel locomotive engines
539
Diesel engines by model
Diesel engines by maker